Minna Grusander (born March 22, 1989) is a Finnish mixed martial artist. She previously competed for Invicta Fighting Championships. Grusander fought Jinh Yu Frey for the Invicta atomweight title.

Mixed martial arts career

Early career
Grusander made her professional debut against Iman Darabi at FNF 10. She won the fight by majority decision.

Grusander was scheduled to fight Anna Kuzmenko at Battle of Botnia 2016. She won the fight by a third-round technical knockout.

Grusander was scheduled to fight the former K-1 Krush Flyweight and future Pancrase champion Syuri Kondo at Pancrase 284. Kondo won the fight by unanimous decision.

Returning to Finland, Grusander was scheduled to fight Tiia Kohtamaki at FNF 14. Grusander won the fight by a third-round technical knockout.

Grusnader was scheduled to fight Elena Belaya at FNF 15. She won the fight by a first-round rear-naked choke submission.

Grusander was scheduled to fight outside of Finaland for the second time in her professional career, being scheduled to fight Hanna Gujwan at Ladies Fight Night 8. She won the fight by a second-round rear-naked choke.

Invicta
Grusander was scheduled to make her Invicta debut against Fernanda Barros at Invicta FC 28: Mizuki vs. Jandiroba. The fight was likewise Grusander's atomweight debut. Grusander won the fight by a second-round TKO.

In her second fight with Invicta, Grusander was scheduled to challenge the reigning Invicta FC Atomweight champion Jinh Yu Frey at Invicta FC 30: Frey vs. Grusander. Frey won the fight by a highly controversial unanimous decision (49-46, 48-47, 48-47). The majority of fans scored the fight for Grusander. MMA Viking awarded the fight the 2018 "Robbery of the Year".

An immediate rematch with Jinh Yu Frey was scheduled for Invicta FC 33: Frey vs. Grusander II. Frey won the closely contested fight by split decision, with scores of 48-47, 47-48 and 48-47. The media members scored the fight for Frey.

Post title fights
After losing back-to-back title fights, Grusander returned to strawweight and was scheduled to fight Magdaléna Šormová at Oktagon 16. Šormová won the fight by unanimous decision.

Grusander faced Shauna Bannon on March 15, 2023, at Invicta FC 52: Machado vs. McCormack. She lost the fight via unanimous decision.

Championships and accomplishments
IMMAF
 2015 IMMAF Amateur MMA World Championships (52kg)
Invicta Fighting Championships
Performance of the Night (One time) vs. Kalyn Schwartz
Nordic Awards
2017 Female Fighter of the Year
2018 Robbery of the Year vs. Jinh Yu Frey

Mixed martial arts record

|-
|Loss
| style="text-align:center;"|6–5
|Shauna Bannon
|Decision (unanimous)
|Invicta FC 52: Machado vs. McCormack
|
|align=center| 3
|align=center| 5:00
|Denver, Colorado, United States
|
|-
|Loss
| style="text-align:center;"|6–4
|Magdaléna Šormová
|Decision (unanimous)
|Oktagon 16
|
| style="text-align:center;"| 3
| style="text-align:center;"| 5:00
|Brno, Czech Republic
|
|-
|Loss
| style="text-align:center;"|6–3
|Jinh Yu Frey
|Decision (split)
|Invicta FC 33: Frey vs. Grusander II
|
| style="text-align:center;"| 5
| style="text-align:center;"| 5:00
|Kansas City, Missouri, United States
|For the Invicta FC Atomweight Championship
|-
|Loss
| style="text-align:center;"|6–2
|Jinh Yu Frey
|Decision (unanimous)
|Invicta FC 30: Frey vs. Grusander
|
| style="text-align:center;"| 5
| style="text-align:center;"| 5:00
|Kansas City, Missouri, United States
|For the Invicta FC Atomweight Championship
|-
|Win
| style="text-align:center;"|6–1
|Fernanda Barros
|TKO (punches)
|Invicta FC 28: Mizuki vs. Jandiroba
|
| style="text-align:center;"| 2
| style="text-align:center;"| 4:26
|Salt Lake City, Utah, United States 
|
|-
|Win
| style="text-align:center;"|5–1
|Hanna Gujwan
|Submission (rear-naked choke)
|Ladies Fight Night 8
|
| style="text-align:center;"| 2
| style="text-align:center;"| 2:10
|Łódź, Poland
|
|-
|Win
| style="text-align:center;"|4–1
|Elena Belaya
|Submission (rear-naked choke)
|FNF 15
|
| style="text-align:center;"| 1
| style="text-align:center;"| 2:08
|Karkkilan, Finland
|
|-
|Win
| style="text-align:center;"|3–1
|Tiia Kohtamaki
|TKO (punches)
|FNF 14
|
| style="text-align:center;"| 3
| style="text-align:center;"| 4:02
|Turku, Finland
|
|-
|Loss
| style="text-align:center;"|2–1
|Syuri Kondo
|Decision (unanimous)
|Pancrase 284
|
| style="text-align:center;"| 3
| style="text-align:center;"| 5:00
|Tokyo, Japan
|
|-
|Win
| style="text-align:center;"|2–0
|Anna Kuzmenko
|TKO (punches)
|Battle of Botnia 2016
|
| style="text-align:center;"| 3
| style="text-align:center;"| 1:44
|Umeå, Sweden
|
|-
|Win
| style="text-align:center;"|1–0
|Iman Darabi
|Decision (majority)
|FNF 10
|
| style="text-align:center;"| 3
| style="text-align:center;"| 5:00
|Turku, Finland
|
|-
|}

See also
 List of female mixed martial artists

References

External links
 
 Minna Grusander at Invicta FC

1989 births
Living people
Finnish female mixed martial artists
Atomweight mixed martial artists
Mixed martial artists utilizing Muay Thai
Mixed martial artists utilizing Brazilian jiu-jitsu
People from Salo, Finland
Finnish Muay Thai practitioners
Female Muay Thai practitioners
Finnish practitioners of Brazilian jiu-jitsu
Female Brazilian jiu-jitsu practitioners
Sportspeople from Southwest Finland
21st-century Finnish women